William Dearis Corbin (born December 8, 1990) is an American football offensive guard who is currently a free agent. He played college football at Appalachian State and attended Triton High School in Erwin, North Carolina. He has also been a member of the Indianapolis Colts and Jacksonville Jaguars.

Early life
Corbin attended Triton High School in Erwin, North Carolina where he played football.

College career
Corbin played for the Appalachian State Mountaineers from 2010 to 2014. He was the team's starter his final three years and helped the Mountaineers to 27 wins. He played in 35 games during his career including 30 starts at right tackle. Corbin started as a defensive lineman before moving to the offensive line due to injures during the 2010 season. Corbin appeared in two games as a defensive lineman.

Professional career

Indianapolis Colts
On May 26, 2015, Corbin was signed by the Indianapolis Colts after a tryout. On July 27, 2015, Corbin was released by the Colts.

Jacksonville Jaguars
On August 24, 2015, Corbin signed with the Jacksonville Jaguars. Corbin was released September 4, 2015, after two preseason games with the Jaguars.

Saskatchewan Roughriders
Corbin signed with the Saskatchewan Roughriders on May 30, 2016. Corbin was released on June 12, 2016.

Washington Valor
Corbin was assigned to the Washington Valor on January 10, 2017.

Atlanta Legends
Corbin was signed by the Atlanta Legends of the Alliance of American Football, but was waived before the start of the 2019 regular season.

References

External links
Appalachian State Mountaineers bio
Arena Football League bio

American football fullbacks
American football offensive linemen
Canadian football offensive linemen
American players of Canadian football
Appalachian State Mountaineers football players
Indianapolis Colts players
Jacksonville Jaguars players
Saskatchewan Roughriders players
Washington Valor players
1990 births
Living people